WTA may refer to:

Organizations
Washington Trails Association
Whatcom Transportation Authority
Waskahegan Trail Association, the management board for the Waskahegan Trail
Water Transit Authority, former name of the San Francisco Bay Area Water Emergency Transportation Authority
Whatcom Transportation Authority, a bus agency in Washington State, USA
Wichita Terminal Association, a railroad
Wisconsin Towns Association
Women's Tennis Association
World Transhumanist Association, former name of Humanity+

Other uses
Wall teichoic acid, teichoic acids that are covalently bound to peptidoglycan in bacteria
Warcop Training Area, a UK Ministry of Defence military training area, Cumbria, North West England
Weapon target assignment problem
Willingness to accept
Winner takes all (disambiguation)